The 1959 Tennessee Volunteers (variously "Tennessee", "UT" or the "Vols") represented the University of Tennessee in the 1959 NCAA University Division football season. Playing as a member of the Southeastern Conference (SEC), the team was led by head coach Bowden Wyatt, in his fifth year, and played their home games at Shields–Watkins Field in Knoxville, Tennessee. They finished the season with a record of five wins, four losses and one tie (5–4–1 overall, 3–4–1 in the SEC).

Schedule

Roster
TB Bill Majors, Jr.

Team players drafted into the NFL

References

Tennessee
Tennessee Volunteers football seasons
Tennessee Volunteers football